Minamoto no Yoshinaka tried to wrest power from his cousins Yoritomo and Yoshitsune, seeking to take command of the Minamoto clan. To that end, he burned the Hōjūji Palace, and kidnapped Emperor Go-Shirakawa. However, his cousins Noriyori and Yoshitsune caught up with him soon afterwards, following him across the Bridge over the Uji, New Year's Day, 1184, which Yoshinaka had torn up to impair their crossing.

This was an ironic reversal of the first Battle of the Uji, only four years earlier.  Much as the Taira did in that first battle, Minamoto no Yoshitsune led his horsemen across the river, and defeated Yoshinaka.

See also
Kajiwara Kagesue
Sasaki Takatsuna
The Tale of the Heike

References 

1180s in Japan
1184 in Asia
Uji 1184
Uji 1184